The 1949 Furman Purple Hurricane football team was an American football team that represented Furman University as a member of the Southern Conference (SoCon) during the 1949 college football season. In their second year under head coach Red Smith, the Purple Hurricane compiled an overall record of 3–6, with a conference mark of 3–3, and finished tied for seventh in the SoCon.

Schedule

References

Furman
Furman Paladins football seasons
Furman Purple Hurricane football